Jean de Florette is a 1986 period drama film directed by Claude Berri, based on a novel by Marcel Pagnol. It is followed by Manon des Sources. The story takes place in rural Provence, where two local farmers plot to trick a newcomer out of his newly inherited property. The film starred three of France's most prominent actors – Gérard Depardieu, Daniel Auteuil, who won a BAFTA award for his performance, and Yves Montand in one of his last roles.

The film was shot back to back with Manon des Sources, over a period of seven months. At the time the most expensive French film ever made, it was a great commercial and critical success, both domestically and internationally, and was nominated for eight César awards, and 10 BAFTAs. The success of the two films helped promote Provence as a tourist destination.

Plot 
The story takes place outside a village in Provence, in the south of France, shortly after the First World War. Ugolin Soubeyran returns from his military service and throws himself into a project to grow carnations on his property in the mountains. His uncle César, referred to as Le Papet, meaning grandfather in the local dialect of French, is at first skeptical, but is convinced when the flowers get a good price at the market. They decide the project is worthy of expansion, and together they go to see the neighboring farmer, Pique-Bouffigue, to buy his land. The land in question is apparently dry, but Papet knows of a spring that could solve that problem.

Pique-Bouffigue does not want to sell, and an altercation breaks out. In the fight, Pique-Bouffigue is killed. After the funeral, Papet and Ugolin plug the spring that could water the land and cover it with cement and earth. Unknown to them, they are seen blocking the spring by a poacher.

The property is inherited by Pique-Bouffigue's sister, Florette, who left the area long ago, but she dies very soon afterward and the inheritance goes to her son, Jean Cadoret, who is a tax collector and a hunchback. Ugolin, according to local custom, refers to him as Jean de Florette – Florette's Jean. To discourage Jean from taking up residence, Ugolin damages the roof of the house.

Jean arrives with his wife, Aimée, and young daughter, Manon. He makes it clear that he has no intention of selling. He intends to make the farm profitable within two years, breeding rabbits and growing their feed himself. Jean does not know about the nearby blocked spring, only of one that is more distant, 2 kilometres away, though still on the property. He is relying on rainfall to fill a cistern to supply the livestock and irrigate the crops. Ugolin and Papet keep secret from Jean the fact that the area where Jean's farm lies rarely gets any rain. Meanwhile, they work to turn the local community against Jean, because the deceased Pique-Bouffigue has cousins in the village who know about the blocked spring and would tell Jean about it if they became friendly with him.

Jean initially makes progress and earns a small profit from his rabbit farm. In the long run, however, getting water proves a problem. Dragging it all the way from the distant spring is a backbreaking task. Jean asks to borrow Ugolin's mule, but Ugolin gives vague excuses. When the rain does come, it falls on the surrounding area but not where it is needed. The dusty winds of the sirocco then arrive, bringing the farm near catastrophe. Jean decides to dig a well. 

Ugolin tells Jean that his project is hopeless and that he might be better off selling. Jean asks how much he could expect to receive for the farm, and Ugolin gives an estimate of around 8,000 francs. However, it turns out that Jean has no intention of selling, but wants to use the value of the property to take out a mortgage. Papet decides that he will himself grant the mortgage, because that way he will either earn the interest or drive Jean away for good. 

From the mortgage money Jean buys dynamite to finish the well, but in his first blast is hit by a flying rock, falls into the cavity, and subsequently dies of his injuries. Ugolin returns with the news to Papet, who asks him why he's crying. "It is not me who's crying," he responds, "it's my eyes."

Aimée and Manon cannot remain on the farm, and Papet buys them out. As mother and daughter are packing their belongings, Papet and Ugolin go to where they blocked the spring and remove the plug. Manon follows them, and when she sees what they are doing, she understands and screams. The men hear it, but dismiss the sound as that of a buzzard. Papet performs a mock baptism of his nephew in the water of the spring.

Cast
 Yves Montand as César Soubeyran / "Le Papet": In the local dialect "Papet" is an affectionate term for "grandfather". César is the proud patriarch of a dying family, and his only known relative is his nephew Ugolin. Eager to restore his family's position, he manipulates his nephew to do his bidding. For Yves Montand the filming experience was particularly trying because his wife of thirty-three years, Simone Signoret, died during filming. Montand himself died in 1991, and the two films were among the last of a cinematic career spanning forty-five years. Having grown up in nearby Marseilles, he visited the location before filming started, and endeared himself to the locals.
 Daniel Auteuil as Ugolin: Ugolin is César's "rat-faced sub-intelligent nephew". Somewhat more conscientious than his uncle, he is nevertheless persuaded to carry through with the diabolical plan. Auteuil used a prosthetic nose to make the character uglier. The role represented a great change for Auteuil. He had previously tended to play "smart, funny, urban hipster types", and the role as Ugolin – which earned him both a BAFTA and a César – was a great step forward in his career.
 Gérard Depardieu as Jean Cadoret / "Jean de Florette": Jean is a city man with a romantic idea of the countryside, yet obstinate and hard-working. Depardieu was well established as a versatile actor even before this role. Seemingly impervious to the great pressure on the film crew, he earned a reputation on the set for "fooling about, telling jokes, swearing at planes interrupting the shot and never knowing his lines until the camera was rolling".
 Élisabeth Depardieu (Gérard Dépardieu's wife) as Aimée Cadoret: Jean's beautiful wife is a former opera singer, who has named her daughter after her favourite role, Manon Lescaut.
 Ernestine Mazurowna as Manon, the daughter of Jean and Aimée.

Production
Marcel Pagnol's 1952 film Manon des Sources was four hours long, and subsequently cut by its distributor. The end result left Pagnol dissatisfied, and led him to retell the story as a novel. The first part of the novel, titled Jean de Florette, was an exploration of the background for the film; a prequel of sorts. Together the two volumes made up the work Pagnol called L'Eau des collines (The Water of the Hills). Berri came across Pagnol's book by chance in a hotel room, and was captivated by it. He decided that in order to do the story justice it had to be made in two parts.

Jean de Florette was filmed in and around the Vaucluse department of Provence, where a number of different places have been mentioned as filming locations. La Treille, east of Marseille, in the Bouches-du-Rhône department, was the village where Pagnol had shot the original film. The village is now within the city limits of Marseille and has undergone extensive development since the 1950s, so Berri had to find alternatives. For the village of the story he settled on Mirabeau (65 km to the north), while Jean de Florette's house is located in Vaugines, where the church from the film can also be found. The market scenes were filmed in Sommières in the Gard, and the story's Les Romarins was in reality Riboux in the Var.

Extensive work was put into creating a genuine and historically correct atmosphere for the film. The facades of the houses of Mirabeau had to be replaced with painted polystyrene, to make them look older, and all electric wires were put underground. Meanwhile, in Vaugines, Berri planted a dozen olive trees twelve months before filming started, and watered them throughout the waiting period, and for the second installment planted 10,000 carnations on the farm.

Jean de Florette and Manon des Sources were filmed together, over a period of thirty weeks, from May to December 1985. This allowed Berri to show the dramatic seasonal changes of the Provençal landscape. At 120 million French Franc ($17 million), it was at the time the most expensive film project in French history. The long filming period and the constantly increasing cost put a great burden on the actors, many of whom frequently had to return to Paris for television or theatre work. Once completed, the release of the film was a great national event. A special promotional screening before the film's official release 27 August 1986, was attended by then Minister of Culture Jack Lang. The musical score is based around the aria Invano Alvaro from Giuseppe Verdi's 1862 opera La forza del destino.

Reception
The film was a great success in its native France, where it was seen by over seven million people. It also performed very well internationally; in the United States it grossed nearly $5 million, placing it among the 100 most commercially successful foreign-language films shown there.

Critical reception for Jean de Florette was almost universally positive. 
Rita Kempley, writing for The Washington Post, compared the story to the fiction of William Faulkner. Allowing that it could indeed be "a definitive French masterwork", she reserved judgement until after the premiere of the second part, as Jean de Florette was only a "half-movie", "a long, methodic buildup, a pedantically paced tease". 
Roger Ebert of the Chicago Sun-Times commented on Berri's exploration of human character, "the relentlessness of human greed, the feeling that the land is so important the human spirit can be sacrificed to it". Ebert gave the film three-and-a-half out of four stars.

The staff reviewer for the entertainment magazine Variety highlighted – as other reviewers did as well – the cinematography of Bruno Nuytten (an effort that won Nuytten a BAFTA award and a César nomination). The reviewer commended Berri particularly for the work done with the small cast, and for his decision to stay true to Pagnol's original story. Richard Bernstein, reviewing the film for The New York Times, wrote it was "like no other film you've seen in recent years". He called it an updated, faster-paced version of Pagnol, where the original was still recognisable. The newspaper lists the film among the "Best 1000 Movies Ever Made". 
Later reviews show that the film has stood up to the passage of time. Tasha Robinson, reviewing the DVD release of the two films for The A.V. Club in 2007, called the landscape, as portrayed by Berri and Nuytten, "almost unbearably beautiful". Grading the films 'A', she called them "surprisingly tight and limber" for a four-hour film cycle.

Awards 
Nominated for a total of eight César awards in 1987 – including 'Best Film', 'Best Director' and 'Best Cinematography' – Jean de Florette won only one, 'Best Actor' for Daniel Auteuil. 
At the BAFTA awards the next year it fared better, winning awards for 'Best Actor in a Supporting Role' (Auteuil), 'Best Cinematography', 'Best Film' and 'Best Adapted Screenplay'. The film also earned six more nominations, including both Depardieu and Montand in the 'Best Actor'-category, as well as 'Best Direction' and 'Best Foreign Language Film'. 
Amongst other honours for the film were a U.S. National Board of Review award for 'Best Foreign Language Film', and a 'Best Foreign Language Film' nomination at the 1988 Golden Globes. It was also nominated for the Golden Prize at the 15th Moscow International Film Festival.

Legacy
Jean de Florette and Manon des Sources have been interpreted as part of a wider trend in the 1980s of so-called 'heritage cinema': period pieces and costume dramas that celebrated the history, culture and landscape of France. It was the official policy of President François Mitterrand, elected in 1981, and particularly his Minister of Culture Jack Lang, to promote these kinds of films through increased funding of the ailing French film industry. Berri's pair of films stand as the most prominent example of this effort. It has also been suggested that the treatment given the outsider Jean de Florette by the locals was symbolic of the growing popularity of the anti-immigration movement, led by politicians like Jean-Marie Le Pen.

The two films are often seen, in conjunction with Peter Mayle's book A Year in Provence, as causing increased interest in, and tourism to, the region of Provence, particularly among the British. The films inspired a vision of the area as a place of rural authenticity, and were followed by an increase in British home ownership in southern France. As late as 2005, the owners of the house belonging to Jean de Florette in the movie were still troubled by tourists trespassing on their property.

Jean de Florette served as an inspiration for the 1998 Malayalam–language Indian film Oru Maravathoor Kanavu.

Ranked No. 60 in Empire magazine's "The 100 Best Films of World Cinema" in 2010.

References

External links

 
 
 
 Trailer (1986)
 Transcript

1986 films
Italian drama films
1980s French-language films
1986 drama films
Films based on works by Marcel Pagnol
Films directed by Claude Berri
Films featuring a Best Actor César Award-winning performance
Films about rabbits and hares
Films set in France
French drama films
Best Film BAFTA Award winners
Films whose writer won the Best Adapted Screenplay BAFTA Award
Films with screenplays by Claude Berri
Films with screenplays by Gérard Brach
Films about agriculture
1980s Italian films
1980s French films

ja:愛と宿命の泉#PART1『フロレット家のジャン』